Carol Ann Shanahan  (born December 1957) is an English businesswoman and club chairperson of Port Vale Football Club.

Business career
Shanahan was born in December 1957 in Skegness. She moved to West Bromwich at the age of six to live with her mother, who was the secretary to the West Bromwich Albion club doctor; it was at The Hawthorns that Shanahan first became interested in football. She left school without any formal qualifications. At age 17, she became the first female main-frame computer operator at Hoskins systems in Birmingham. She met Kevin Shanahan in 1979, a fellow IT worker. The pair would later marry and have four children – Kate, Rosie, Patrick and Francesca – before founding fintech company Synectics Solutions in February 1992. Synectics work to prevent fraud and have international clients that include governments, banks, building societies and insurance companies. Originally based in Newcastle-under-Lyme, the company moved to Burslem in 2015, in a large building next to Vale Park. The company received one of the Queen's Awards for Enterprise in 2019, leading her to state that "To win an award of this calibre is a fantastic achievement, contributed to by every one of our 360 employees. Of the many awards we have won over the past few years, this is the pinnacle of our work to date." This came two years after Shanahan was named as 'Director of the Year for Leadership in Corporate Social Responsibility' at the Institute of Directors awards. The Shanahans set up hospitality firm Summit Hospitality after finding they had extra rooms in Synectics' new building. She was awarded an honorary doctorate by Staffordshire University in 2017 and also became chair of the Port Vale Foundation Trust. She founded the Hubb Foundation in February 2019, a charitable organisation with the aim of helping underprivileged children in Stoke-on-Trent.

Chair of Port Vale
Having first attempted to buy Port Vale in 2015 and had a £1.25 million rejected in May 2017, she and Kevin finally bought out Norman Smurthwaite for more than £5 million in May 2019 following months of negotiation. Initially she and Kevin were co-chairs of the club, before Kevin stepped down to leave Carol as the sole chair in January 2020. The next month she was voted as the fourth best owner in English football in a poll carried out by the 'Against League 3' pressure group.

Shanahan voted with the chairs of the other League Two clubs to end the 2019–20 season after 37 games due to the COVID-19 pandemic in England, causing Vale to finish one place outside the play-offs; CEO Colin Garlick said that the club had voted for the proposal despite meaning they narrowly would miss out on the play-offs as it would help to secure the financial future of all the clubs in the division. Shanahan said she "came away shaking" from the vote, but made her decision for "the greater good" of the game. A BBC Sport study predicted that Vale would have finished seventh and reached the play-offs if the season had played out. To help the local area during the crisis, Shanahan turned the club into a community hub, delivering food and care packages to the north of the city and working closely with the city council, schools and charities.

Shanahan was appointed Officer of the Order of the British Empire (OBE) in the 2020 Birthday Honours for services to the community of Stoke-on-Trent during the Covid-19 epidemic. She sacked club manager John Askey in January 2021, following a two-month losing run that saw the team drop from the play-off places to 17th in the table. The following month she appointed David Flitcroft as the club's first ever director of football, working alongside new managerial appointment Darrell Clarke – the club paid Walsall a compensation fee in order to sign Clarke. She was given an honorary degree by Keele University in May 2021 and named as a member on the EFL Trust Board three months later. She was named as Community Heroine of the Year at The Women of the Year Luncheon & Awards in April 2022. Clarke returned from a close family bereavement to lead Vale through the League Two play-off semi-finals at the end of the 2021–22 season. Promotion was secured with a 3–0 victory over Mansfield Town in the final.

References

1957 births
Living people
People from Skegness
20th-century English businesswomen
20th-century English businesspeople
21st-century English businesswomen
21st-century English businesspeople
Businesspeople in information technology
English company founders
English women in business
British hospitality businesspeople
English nonprofit executives
English football chairmen and investors
Port Vale F.C. directors and chairmen
Women association football executives
Women sports owners
Alumni of Staffordshire University
Officers of the Order of the British Empire